The Mtwalume River is in KwaZulu-Natal, South Africa. The river arises near Highflats, and has the tributaries Mgeni and Quhu.

References

Rivers of KwaZulu-Natal